Réel is the fourth studio album by the French rapper Kery James, released on 27 April 2009.

The album was a commercial success, led by the singles taken from the album: Le Retour du rap français, Je représente and Lettre à mon public. It was a number one album in France with 23000 copies sold in the first week . The album was certified platinum with more than 100000 copies sold.

Track listing 

The singers are also credited as authors, in addition to the participation of Admiral T as a writer on the first track, and Médine on Track 7.

Chart performance

Weekly charts

Year-end charts

Certifications

Notes and references 

2009 albums